The California state elections, February 2008 were held on February 5, 2008 throughout California. Presidential primaries and a special election for a State Assembly seat were among the contests held. Seven ballot propositions were also decided on.

Presidential primaries

American Independent presidential primary 
Three candidates were on the ballot of the American Independent Party, a state political party.

Democratic presidential primary

Green presidential primary
Seven candidates participated in the Green Party's presidential primary, which is a non-binding contest.

Libertarian presidential primary

Peace and Freedom presidential primary 
Seven candidates participated in the Peace and Freedom presidential primary, a non-binding "beauty contest". Ralph Nader received a plurality of the votes, followed by Gloria La Riva and Cynthia McKinney. Stewart Alexander was nominated to be Socialist Party candidate Brian Moore's running mate in October 2007, but remained on the Peace and Freedom ballot.

Republican presidential primary

Propositions

Proposition 91 

Proposition 91 sought to amend the California Constitution to prohibit motor vehicle fuel sales taxes that are earmarked for transportation purposes from being retained in the state's General Fund.

Proposition 92 

Proposition 92 sought to amend Proposition 98 of 1988, which sets a mandate for the minimum level of funding each year for elementary and secondary schools and community colleges.

Proposition 93 

Proposition 93 sought to change the term limits for members of the California State Legislature in both the State Assembly and State Senate.

Proposition 94 

Proposition 94 sought to expand the Indian Gaming Compact with the Pechanga Band of Luiseño Mission Indians.

Proposition 95 

Proposition 95 sought to expand the Indian Gaming Compact with the Morongo Band of Mission Indians.

Proposition 96 

Proposition 96 sought to expand the Indian Gaming Compact with the Sycuan Band of the Kumeyaay Nation.

Proposition 97 

Proposition 97 sought to expand the Indian Gaming Compact with the Agua Caliente Band of Cahuilla Indians.

55th State Assembly district special election 
The seat of California's 55th State Assembly district was vacated by Assemblymember Laura Richardson, who won a special election to fill California's 37th congressional district on June 26, 2007. The congressional district was vacant after Juanita Millender-McDonald died of cancer on April 22, 2007.

Primary election 
A primary election for the special election was held on December 11, 2007. Since no candidate won a majority, the candidates with the top votes for each party appeared on the ballots for the special election.

Special election

Notes
Voter turnout information is listed where applicable. Turnout information is not available for the American Independent or Democratic primaries because both parties allowed Decline to State voters to participate. There were a total of 328,261 eligible registered voters registered with the American Independent Party, 6,749,406 with the Democratic Party, and 3,043,164 who declined to state. There was a total of 15,712,753 eligible registered voters regardless of party affiliation in the entire state.

See also
Political party strength in California
Political party strength in U.S. states

References

External links
Statement of Vote (official results)

California 02